This is a list of Members of Parliament (MPs) elected  to the 9th Parliament of Elizabeth I in 1597, the 39th year of her reign: the Parliament met on 24 October 1597 and was held to 9 February 1598 when it was dissolved.

List of constituencies and members

Notes

References
D. Brunton & D. H. Pennington, Members of the Long Parliament (London: George Allen & Unwin, 1954)
Cobbett's Parliamentary history of England, from the Norman Conquest in 1066 to the year 1803 (London: Thomas Hansard, 1808)

16th-century English parliaments
1597
 List
1597 in England
16th-century elections
1597 in politics